Jack Hall - was a criminal, who became a notorious highwayman. "Jack Hall" is a traditional British folksong dating from 1707.

Story
John or Jack Hall (d. 1707) was a criminal who, as a young boy, was sold to a chimney sweep for a guinea. In later life he became a notorious highwayman. In 1707 he was arrested along with Stephen Bunce and Dick Low for a burglary committed at the house of Captain Guyon, near Stepney. All three were convicted and hanged at Tyburn on 7 December 1707. A broadsheet of his Gallows Confessional was put to the melody of Captain Kidd, previously executed for piracy in 1701.
Jack Hall's song was made popular in the 1850s with the adaptation Sam Hall by English comic minstrel, C.W. Ross.

Recordings
Steeleye Span recorded Jack Hall on their album Tempted and Tried (1989). It was also released as B-side of the single The Fox (1990).

The Group Sex Poets also recorded a slightly modified version of the song, which was re-interpreted by front man Sean Patrick McDonald in 2010 and released on their debut EP The Jack Hall EP (2011).

Sam Carter recorded Jack Hall on his 2012 album No Testament, with Sam Sweeney of the British folk group Bellowhead on violin. The duo also performed the song live on Jools Holland's Later program on 17 October 2012.

References

External links
Jack Hall's entry from DNB from Wikisource
The Proceedings of the Old Bailey London 1674 to 1913 - Archive of case details for Jack Hall

English folk songs
18th-century songs
Songs about criminals
Cultural depictions of British men
Cultural depictions of robbers